The 1891 Michigan State Normal Normalites football team represented Michigan State Normal School (later renamed Eastern Michigan University) during the 1891 college football season.  In the first season of intercollegiate football at Michigan Normal, the Normalites played only two games, losing to Ann Arbor High School (4–34) and the University of Michigan literary team (0–30). James M. Swift was the team's coach.

The school's 1893 yearbook credits coach Swift with introducing "scientific football" to the school.

The Detroit Free Press reported on the first Michigan Normal football game as follows: "Today witnessed the inaugural game of foot ball in this city [Ypsilanti] between the Ann Arbor High School and the Normals. The Normals began practicing less than a fortnight ago with some good material, including Paton, formerly manager of athletic sports at Oberlin College, and Swift, of Massachusetts, a noted player. Dergan, the norma sprinter, has turned out to be an excellent quarter-back, and the entire team with little practice will surely develop into a winning eleven." Dorgan scored a touchdown in the first half (counting for four points at that time) for the first points scored in the program's history.

The players who participated in Michigan Normal's first season of college football included George H Adams, Walter M. Adrion, Frank E. Angevine, Frank E. Arthur, and James M. Swift.

Schedule

References

Michigan State Normal
Eastern Michigan Eagles football seasons
Michigan State Normal Normalites football